Lucinda Kate Riley (16 February 1965 – 11 June 2021) was a Northern Irish author of popular historical fiction, originally an actress.

Biography
Lucinda Edmonds was born in Lisburn and spent the first few years of her life in the village of Drumbeg near Belfast before moving to England. At age 14, she enrolled in the Italia Conti Academy of Theatre Arts in London to study theatre and ballet. At 16, she got her first major television role in the BBC adaptation of The Story of the Treasure Seekers, followed shortly afterwards by a guest role in Auf Wiedersehen Pet. She remained a working actress for the next seven years.

Her acting career was interrupted by a long bout of mononucleosis. This caused her to turn to writing, and her first novel Lovers and Players was published in 1992.

From 1988 to 1998, she was married to actor Owen Whittaker, with whom she had two children, Harry and Bella. From 2000 until her death, she was married to Stephen Riley, with whom she also had two children, Leonora and Kit. Through her second marriage, she also had three stepchildren, Olivia, William and Max. She took a break from writing, returning to it in 2010; her subsequent novels were published under her married name.

In 2016, producer Raffaella De Laurentiis purchased the television rights to her novel series The Seven Sisters. This novel series made her a bestseller author, predominantly in the Netherlands and Germany. Combined, the series has sold over 30 million books.

In 2019, Riley revealed to Norwegian newspaper Verdens Gang that she had oesophageal cancer. She continued to work, producing five novels during the four years of her illness, but was unable to complete the planned final eighth novel in her Seven Sisters series, which is being written by her son, Harry Whittaker. She died on 11 June 2021.

In May 2022, her stepdaughter Olivia Riley, who was a personal assistant and publishing executive for Lucinda Riley Ltd, was killed after being hit by a car while walking her dogs in London.

Filmography
 The Story of the Treasure Seekers (1982)
 Auf Wiedersehen, Pet (1983)
 Jumping the Queue (1989)

Bibliography
As Lucinda Edmonds
Lovers and Players (1992)
Hidden Beauty (1993)
Enchanted (1994)
Not Quite an Angel (1995)
Aria (1996)
Losing You (1997)
Playing With Fire (1998)
Seeing Double (2000)

As Lucinda Riley
The Orchid House (also known as Hothouse Flower) (2010)
The Girl on the Cliff (2011)
The Light Behind the Window (also known as The Lavender Garden) (2012)
The Midnight Rose (2013)
The Angel Tree (2014)
The Italian Girl (a rewrite of Aria) (2014)
The Olive Tree (also published as Helena's Secret) (2016)
The Love Letter (a rewrite of Seeing Double) (2018)
The Butterfly Room (2019)
The Murders at Fleat House (2022)

The Seven Sisters series 
The Seven Sisters (2014)
The Storm Sister (2015)
The Shadow Sister (2016)
The Pearl Sister (2017)
The Moon Sister (2018)
The Sun Sister (2019)
The Missing Sister (2021)

References

External links
 Official site
 

1965 births
2021 deaths
Irish novelists
20th-century actresses from Northern Ireland
Television actresses from Northern Ireland
20th-century Irish women writers
20th-century Irish novelists
21st-century Irish women writers
21st-century Irish novelists
People from Lisburn
Deaths from esophageal cancer
Deaths from cancer in Northern Ireland